Filatima vaniae is a moth of the family Gelechiidae. It is found in North America, where it has been recorded from Utah and California.

The wingspan is 15–18 mm. The forewings are very pale grey to whitish, the scales tipped with fuscous. There is an ochreous-tawny shade from the base to the apex in the costal third and an ill-defined whitish transverse fascia at the apical fourth. A dark fuscous, elongate dash is found in the fold. It is edged with tawny scales. The discal spot at the end of the cell is fuscous and small, while the remaining spots are obsolete or indistinct and fuscous. The hindwings are light greyish fuscous, narrowly edged with dark fuscous.

The larvae feed on Ribes species.

References

Moths described in 1947
Filatima